Aleksei Nikolayevich Leonov (born 21 January 1977) is a former Russian professional footballer.

External links
 

1977 births
People from Moscow Oblast
Living people
Russian footballers
Association football midfielders
Dinaburg FC players
FC Partizan Minsk players
Latvian Higher League players
Belarusian Premier League players
Russian expatriate footballers
Expatriate footballers in Latvia
Expatriate footballers in Belarus
Russian expatriate sportspeople in Latvia
FC Spartak-2 Moscow players
Sportspeople from Moscow Oblast